Trade City (also Davidsville) is an unincorporated community in Indiana County, Pennsylvania, United States.

History

Notoriety 
On June 3, 2012, Richard Shotts was murdered in North Mahoning Township near Trade City. Shaun Fairman was convicted in 2013 of the murder, and his appeal to the Pennsylvania Supreme Court in 2019 was rejected.

References

Unincorporated communities in Indiana County, Pennsylvania
Unincorporated communities in Pennsylvania